Harrison Bright is a Welsh footballer who plays as a defender for Pontypridd United on loan from Newport County.

He made his senior debut for Newport on 6 October 2020 in the 5-0 EFL Trophy defeat to Norwich City Under 21's as a second half replacement for Robbie Willmott. He made his second appearance for Newport on 10 November 2020 in the 3–1 EFL Trophy defeat to Plymouth Argyle as a half time substitute for Scot Bennett. Bright made his football league debut for Newport on 7 May 2022 in the EFL League Two 2-0 defeat to Rochdale as a second half substitute. In May 2022 he signed his first professional contract with Newport County 

On 31 January 2023 Bright joined Pontypridd United on loan for the remainder of the 2022-23 season.

International
Bright was called up to the Wales Under-18 squad for the Croatia tournament in June 2022.

References

External links

Living people
People from Blaenavon
Sportspeople from Torfaen
]
2004 births
Welsh footballers
Association football defenders
Newport County A.F.C. players
English Football League players